Atwood is a small town located in Perth County, Ontario, Canada. Nearby centres include Listowel and Elmira.  Atwood is located on Highway 23 between Perth Line 75 (formerly 8th Concession) and Perth Line 72.

The population is between 500 and 1000 inhabitants.

There are 2 churches in Atwood, The Atwood United Church and Atwood Presbyterian Church, as well as the Elma Township Cemetery.

The Atwood/Coghlin Airport is located here.

History
The settlement dates back to 1854 when it was originally named “Elma Centre”. When the railway came through in 1876, the name was changed to “Newry Station”. The current name, Atwood, was suggested in 1883 by William Dunn after his niece Eliza Gray, of Detroit, had noticed that the new hamlet was surrounded by woods .

The “Atwood WG&B Ry Station” was built in 1877. The first railway station master was M. Duncan of the Great West Railway. The entrance to the station was from George Street, (now George Avenue). The station closed in 1969 and was later demolished.

In 2011, Kenneth Rea, a volunteer firefighter from Atwood, was killed battling a fire in Listowel when the roof of the building collapsed.

Notable people

 Mary Vallance, OMM C.D. Officer of the Order of Military Merit. Mary was a colonel in the Canadian Forces serving from 1954 to 1976. Mary implemented the Status of Women Commission Rulings which allowed Service Women to assume any military position. She was directly responsible for all women personnel. Mary holds the distinction of being the first female Colonel and served as Aide-De-Camp to the Governor General. A Street in Atwood bears the Vallance name after her.
 John G. Inglis, electrical engineer and transit manager.

References

Communities in Perth County, Ontario